Two ships of the Royal Navy have borne the name HMS Maenad, after the maenads, female followers of Dionysus in Greek mythology:

  was an  launched in 1915 and sold in 1921.
  was an  launched in 1944 and scrapped in 1957.

References

Royal Navy ship names